Louis Candide Boulanger (1806 – 1867) was a French Romantic painter, pastellist, lithographer and a poet, known for his religious and allegorical subjects, portraits, genre scenes.

Life 

Boulanger was born in Piedmont where his father, François-Louis Boulanger, Lieutenant colonel of the Napoleon Army met his mother, Marie-Magdeleine-Gertrude Archibbuggi.

In 1821 he joined the École des Beaux-Arts where he received classical training in the style of Jacques-Louis David from Guillaume Guillon Lethière and befriended Achille Devéria.  He decided to become a painter "under the influence of the chiefs of the romantic school".

In 1824 he was amongst the finalists of the Prix de Rome and met his life-long friend writer Victor Hugo.

In 1827 Boulanger and his family moved to a rented flat at 11 Rue Notre-Dame-des-Champs.

In 1840 he was awarded the Legion of Honor.

In 1956 he married 27-year-old Adélaïde Catherine Amélie Lemonnier-Delafosse (1829-after 1900) and the couple had two sons.

In 1860 he was appointed director of the École Impériale des Beaux-Arts de Dijon, now the École nationale supérieure d'art de Dijon.  He died here in 1867 and is buried in Paris.

On his death, Victor Hugo wrote to Madame Boulanger: “I owe Louis Boulanger my best memories. His youth and mine were intertwined. Even as a teenager myself I noticed how talented he was."

Career

Among his notable friends were Victor Hugo, history painter Eugène Devéria, writer Honoré de Balzac, poet Aloysius Bertrand, literary critic Charles Augustin Sainte-Beuve, novelist Alexandre Dumas fils, architect Charles Robelin, writer Alfred de Musset, sculptor David d'Angers, painter Nicolas Toussaint Charlet, and writer Prosper Mérimée.

In 1827 he and Devéria illustrated "Souvenirs du Théâtre Anglais à Paris" by Charles-François-Jean-Baptiste Moreau de Commagny.  This year he obtained the second-class medal from the École des Beaux-Arts, followed by the first-class medal in 1836 and the cross in 1840.

In 1829 he went to Germany and in 1831 England, with Sainte-Beuve and Robelin, to visit museums and churches.  He kept journals of his travels.
 
He illustrated several Romantic works of Alexandre Dumas, "Les Orientales" (1827) and seven editions of "The Hunchback of Notre-Dame" (1836) by Victor Hugo, and "Souvenirs du théâtre anglais à Paris" by Moreau de Commagny.  Both Hugo and Boulanger were passionate about knights, dragons and medieval mobsters.

Boulanger created stage costumes for some of Victor Hugo's theater plays, such as "Hernani" in 1829, "Ruy Blas" in 1838, and "Les Burgraves", in 1843.

From 1835 his style shifted from romanticism and focused on more detailed design, turning to classical literature for inspiration.  He produced most of his portraits during this time.

In 1846 he travelled to Spain with Dumas, Giraud and Maquet.  After visiting Toledo, Aranjuez, Jaen and Granada, they arrived to Madrid to visit the Prado Museum, where Boulanger was particularly struck by Goya, Velázquez, Titian, Rubens and Salvator Rosa.  After this trip his style shifted again to explore more romantic techniques.

In 1850 Boulanger painted the chapel of the Souls of Purgatory at Saint-Roch and a “Torment of St-Laurent” in the transept chapel of Saint-Laurent church in Paris.  He also provided mural paintings for the frieze of the Palace of Versailles, the Senate chamber at the Luxembourg Palace, and the Palace de Saint-Cloud.

Legacy

Louis Boulanger took an active role in the Romantic Movement and painted the portraits of several personalities such as writer George Sand, Victor Hugo, Adèle Foucher, writer Petrus Borel and many others.

His paintings show the influence of French painter Antoine-Jean Gros, French painter and writer Eugène Fromentin, English painter John Constable, and later in life by Spanish painter Francisco Goya.

Although his creations may be criticised for their ‘literary’ inspiration (in particular “La Ronde du Sabbat”, and “Petrarch’s Triumph”), his pastel sky studies prefigure Paul Huet and Eugène Boudin.

His works can be found in French collections, including the Louvre, Maison de Victor Hugo, and Musée des beaux-arts de Tours.

His son Louis René Boulanger (1860-1917) also became a painter.

Notable works

 "Supplice de Mazeppa", 1827, his first hit at the Salon, Musée des Beaux-Arts de Rouen
 "The Ronde du Sabbat", 1828
 "La Feu du Ciel", c. 1828, Maison de Victor Hugo, Paris, lithographed in 1831
 "Les Fantômes", 1829
 "King Leaving for the Town Hall", 1831
 "La mort de Bailly", 1831, rejected by the Paris Salon.
 "Assassination of the Duke of Orléans", 1833, Musée des beaux-arts de Troyes
 "Petrarch’s Triumph", 1836
 "Portrait of Honoré de Balzac", c. 1837 
 "Trois amours poétiques: Béatrix, Laure, Orsolina", c. 1840, Musée des Augustins, Toulouse
 "Notre-Dame de Pitié", 1844
 "Dante's inferno", 1850
 "St Jerome and the Roman Fugitives", 1855
 "Adélaïde Boulanger, née Lemoinier-Delafosse (1829-after 1900), wife of the artist", 1858, Louvre.
 "Virgil’s Georgics", 1864
 "Shoe-lace Seller", 1864
 "Vive la joie", 1866, Musée des Beaux-Arts de Dijon.

Gallery

Notes

References

Sources 

 Michael Bryan: "Dictionary of Painters and Engravers, biographical and critical", London: George Bell & Sons, 4, York st, Covent Garden, 1886, p. 168.
 Théophile Gautier, "Histoire du romantisme", Georges Charpentier, Paris, 1874.
 Aristide Marie (1862-1938), "Le Peintre poète Louis Boulanger", H. Floury, coll. "La Vie et l'art romantiques", Paris, 1925.
 Benezit Dictionary of Artists, Éditions Gründ, 2006.

External links 

 Louvre
 France Archives (in French)
 Larousse (in French)
 Musée des Agustins
 British Museum
 Met Museum
 Artcyclopedia

1806 births
1867 deaths
19th-century French painters
French male painters
French romantic painters
People from Vercelli
19th-century French male artists